The 1999 CIBC Canadian Senior Curling Championships were held January 23 to 31 at the Nutana Curling Club in Saskatoon, Saskatchewan.

Men's

Teams

Standings

Results

Draw 1

Draw 2

Draw 3

Draw 4

Draw 5

Draw 6

Draw 7

Draw 8

Draw 9

Draw 10

Draw 11

Draw 12

Draw 13

Draw 14

Draw 15

Draw 16

Playoffs

Semifinal

Final

Women's

Teams

Standings

Results

Draw 1

Draw 2

Draw 3

Draw 4

Draw 5

Draw 6

Draw 7

Draw 8

Draw 9

Draw 10

Draw 11

Draw 12

Draw 13

Draw 14

Draw 15

Draw 16

Playoffs

Semifinal

Final

External links
Men's statistics
Women's statistics

References

1999 in Canadian curling
Canadian Senior Curling Championships
Curling in Saskatoon
1999 in Saskatchewan